"Love Parade" is the fourth single of the band Orange Range. This song was used as the ending theme to the movie Densha Otoko in 2005 and became the number one movie theme of the year. This single stayed at the number-one spot for five weeks and spent over 20 weeks in the top 20 singles in Japan.

Track listing
 Love Parade
 Okihaba Liner O-721

Orange Range songs
2005 singles
Oricon Weekly number-one singles
Japanese film songs
2005 songs